"Only Love" is a song by Greek singer Nana Mouskouri. It is the theme song to the American TV series Mistral's Daughter, based upon the novel by Judith Krantz. When released as a single, it reached number two on the UK Singles Chart in early 1986 and peaked atop the charts of Belgium, Ireland and the Netherlands.

The song was also a hit in its other versions: "L'Amour en Héritage" (French), "Come un'eredità" (Italian), "La dicha del amor" (Spanish), and "Aber die Liebe bleibt" (German). The German version was also recorded with an alternate set of lyrics under the title "Der wilde Wein" but was withdrawn in favour of "Aber die Liebe bleibt".

Charts

Weekly charts

Year-end charts

Sissel Kyrkjebø version
Norwegian soprano Sissel Kyrkjebø covered this song in Norwegian, titled "Kjærlighet" (Love), for her 1986 album Sissel and in Swedish for the Sweden-release of the album in 1987.

References

1984 singles
1984 songs
Carrere Records singles
Dutch Top 40 number-one singles
Irish Singles Chart number-one singles
Nana Mouskouri songs
Number-one singles in Belgium
Philips Records singles
Sissel Kyrkjebø songs
Songs with lyrics by Norman Gimbel